Hydroponic Garden is the first studio album by Swedish ambient duo Carbon Based Lifeforms, released in 2003.

Track listing
All music by Johannes Hedberg and Daniel Ringström.

External links
 Carbon Based Lifeforms official website.

2003 albums
Carbon Based Lifeforms albums